The 2010–11 Minnesota Wild season was the 11th season of play for the National Hockey League franchise that was established on June 25, 1997.

The Wild posted a regular season record of 39 wins, 35 losses and 8 overtime/shootout losses for 86 points, failing to qualify for the Stanley Cup playoffs for the third consecutive season.

Regular season
The Wild opened the season with two games at the Hartwall Areena in Helsinki, Finland, against the Carolina Hurricanes. Goaltender Josh Harding was seriously injured and the Wild signed free agent Jose Theodore to a one-year contract upon the team's return to Minnesota. The Wild ended the regular season with a 5–3 victory over the Dallas Stars, which eliminated the Stars from playoff contention. At the conclusion of the regular season, Todd Richards was fired as head coach.

Playoffs
The Wild attempted to qualify for the playoffs for the first time since the 2007–08 season. However, a loss to the Tampa Bay Lightning on April 2 eliminated the team from playoff contention.

Standings

Schedule and results

Pre-season

Regular season

Player statistics

Skaters
Note: GP = Games played; G = Goals; A = Assists; Pts = Points; +/− = Plus/Minus; PIM = Penalty minutes

Goaltenders
Note: GP = Games played; TOI = Time on ice (minutes); W = Wins; L = Losses; OT = Overtime losses; GA = Goals against; GAA= Goals against average; SA= Shots against; SV= Saves; Sv% = Save percentage; SO= Shutouts

†Denotes player spent time with another team before joining Wild. Stats reflect time with Wild only.
‡Traded mid-season. Stats reflect time with Wild only.

Awards and records

Awards

Records

Milestones

Transactions 
The Wild have been involved in the following transactions during the 2010–11 season.

Trades 

|}

Free agents acquired

Free agents lost

Claimed via waivers

Lost via waivers

Player signings

Draft picks 
Minnesota's picks at the 2010 NHL Entry Draft in Los Angeles, California.

Farm teams 
The Houston Aeros remain Minnesota's primary American Hockey League affiliate in 2010–11 and the Bakersfield Condors will become the team's ECHL affiliate in 2010–11.

References 

Minnesota Wild seasons
M
M